Butte Municipal Airport  is a public-use airport located in Butte, Alaska. It is five nautical miles (9 km) southeast of the central business district of Palmer, a city in the Matanuska-Susitna Borough of the U.S. state of Alaska. The airport is privately owned by the Butte Airman's Association.

Facilities and aircraft 
Butte Municipal Airport has one runway designated 7/25 with a gravel surface measuring is 1,806 by 50 feet (550 x 15 m). For the 12-month period ending December 31, 2005, the airport had 860 general aviation aircraft operations, an average of 71 per month.

References

External links 
 FAA Alaska airport diagram (GIF)

Airports in Matanuska-Susitna Borough, Alaska
Privately owned airports